Black Buffalo may refer to:

 Black Buffalo (chief), grandfather of Crazy Horse
 Black Buffalo (wrestler) (born 1974), Japanese professional wrestler

See also 
 Black buffalo, a species of fish